Walter Spencer Avis was one of the foremost Canadian linguists of his day. Throughout the 1950s to his death at age 60, Avis' mission has been described as "plant[ing] into the minds of his compatriots the notion of Canadian English (CanE) as related but different from other "Englishes"."

Avis was the editor-in-chief of the first edition of the Dictionary of Canadianisms on Historical Principles. Born in Toronto in 1919, Avis belonged to the first generation of PhD-level trained linguists in Canada. He published as of 1950 in the areas of historical linguistics, dialectology, linguistic variation, Canadian English and the budding field of sociolinguistics.

Education
Avis received a B.A. in 1949 at Queen's University. He received an M.A. in 1950 also from Queen's University. He completed work on and earned his PhD in 1955 from the University of Michigan.

Positions and Honours 
From 1952 to his death in 1979, Avis was professor of English at Royal Military College, Kingston, Ontario. He was a long-term secretary of the Canadian Linguistic Association, President from 1968–70, and was slated to become president-elect of the American Dialect Society in January 1980; however, he died suddenly in December 1979.

Death 
Avis died in December 1979 from a heart attack.

Major works 
Avis, Walter S., Patrick D. Drysdale, Robert J. Gregg, Victoria E. Neufeldt and Matthew H. Scargill (eds). 1983. Gage Canadian dictionary. Toronto: Gage. 
Avis, Walter S. (ed.-in-chief), Charles Crate, Patrick Drysdale, Douglas Leechman, Matthew H. Scargill and Charles J. Lovell (eds). 1967. A Dictionary of Canadianisms on Historical Principles. Toronto: Gage.
Avis, Walter S. and A. M. Kinloch (eds). [1978]. Writings on Canadian English, 1792-1975. An annotated bibliography. Toronto: Fitzhenry & Whiteside.
Avis, Walter S. 1973. The English language in Canada In Current trends in linguistics. Vol. 10/1, Thomas Sebeok (ed.), 40-74. The Hague: Mouton.
Avis, Walter S. 1972. So Eh? is Canadian, Eh? Canadian Journal of Linguistics 17(2): 89-104.
Avis, Walter S. 1956. Speech differences along the Ontario-United States border. III: Pronunciation. Journal of the Canadian Linguistic Association 2(1, Mar.): 41-59.
Avis, Walter S. 1955. Speech differences along the Ontario-United States border. II: Grammar and syntax. Journal of the Canadian Linguistic Association 1(1, Mar.): 14-19.
Avis, Walter S. 1954. Speech differences along the Ontario-United States border. I: Vocabulary. Journal of the Canadian Linguistic Association 1(1, Oct.): 13-18.
Avis, Walter S. 1950. The speech of Sam Slick. MA Thesis, Queen's University, Kingston, Ontario.

Notable Canadian dialectologists and historical linguists 
 Charles Boberg
 J. K. Chambers
 Sali A. Tagliamonte

References 

1979 deaths
Linguists from Canada
Dialectologists
Historical linguists of English
Historical linguists
University of Michigan College of Literature, Science, and the Arts alumni
Canadian expatriates in the United States
20th-century linguists